Naval Base Marshall Islands were United States Navy advance bases built on the Marshall Islands during World War II to support the Pacific War efforts. The bases were built by US Navy after the Marshall Islands campaign that captured the islands from the Empire of Japan. By February 1944 the United States Armed Forces had captured the islands. Most of the airfields and other facilities Japan had built were destroyed in allied bombing raids and naval bombardment. US Navy Seabee Construction Battalions arrived as soon as the area was secured and remove the debris. The Seabees quickly repaired, built and improved the airfield/runways and seaport. Seabees often worked around the clock to get airfields operational so that fighter aircraft and bombers could start operating. The bases were used for staging upcoming campaigns and for repair.

History
At the start of World War I, Japan took control of the Marshall Islands from the German Empire. Japan built bases on many of the islands and had troops stationed on the Marshall Islands. The tropical Marshall Islands are near the Equator in the Pacific Ocean, slightly west of the International Date Line. Marshall Islands has over five major islands and 29 coral atolls comprising 1,156 individual islands and islets. The Marshall Islands capital and largest city is Majuro on a large coral atoll, Majuro atoll. The US Naval built bases for troops, ships, submarines, PT boats, seaplanes, supply depots, training camps, fleet recreation facilities, and ship repair depots. To keep supplies following the bases were supplied by the vast II United States Merchant Navy. The Marshall Islands were in Japan's inner line of defense and 2,887 miles from Japan's homeland. At the end of the war, the Marshall Islands came under the control of the United States as part of the Trust Territory of the Pacific Islands until the independence of the Marshall Islands in 1986.

US Navy Marshall Islands Bases
Major US Navy Bases:
Naval Base Eniwetok, Fleet PO Box 3237, after Battle of Eniwetok 	
Naval Base Engebi on Engebi Island in Enewetak Atoll to support Wrigley Airfield, Fleet PO Box 3236 
Naval Base Kwajalein, Fleet PO Box 3233, won in Battle of Kwajalein 	
Naval Base Majuro, Fleet PO Box 3234 	
Majuro Submarine Base
Majuro Destroyer Base
Naval Base Ujelang, on Ujelang Atoll, Fleet PO Box 3238, staging base for Battle of Peleliu
Naval Base Mille, on Mili Atoll to support Milo Airfield, Fleet PO Box 3250 	
Naval Base Moloelap on Maloelap Atoll, to support Taroa Airfield, Fleet PO Box 3119
 Naval Base at  Jaluit Atoll, FPO#3000 
Minor US Navy bases: 
Wotje Atoll on Ormed Island, Fleet PO Box 3243, Naval base to support Wotje Airfield.
Bikini Atoll, Fleet PO Box 3078, Operation Crossroads test site
Rongelap Atoll, Fleet PO Box 3244, former Japan base, Atoll islanders were evacuated before US Castle Bravo test fallout.
Rongerik Atoll, Fleet PO Box 3055, toll islanders were evacuated before Castle Bravo test fallout.
Taongi Atoll, Fleet PO Box 3057
Likiep Atoll, Fleet PO Box 3058
Erikub Atoll, Fleet PO Box 3059
Ailinglaplap Atoll, Fleet PO Box 3060 	
Namu Atoll, Fleet PO Box 3071
Kusaie Island and Lelu Harbor, Fleet PO Box 3072 	
Ebon Atoll, Fleet PO Box 3073
Ujae Atoll, Fleet PO Box 3076
Jaluit Atoll (Majuro Fleet PO Box)
Maug Island, Fleet PO Box 3077

Post war

At the end of the war, the Marshall Islands came under the control of the United States as part of the Trust Territory of the Pacific Islands until the independence of the Marshall Islands in 1986. 
Marshall Islands were given self-government on 1 May 1979. Compact of Free Association was make between the Marshall Islands and United States on 21 October 1986. These close associations United States dollar and English are used in the Marshall Islands. The Compact of Free Association agrees that US is responsible the defense of the Marshall Islands. The compact gives the Marshall Islands Marshallese) the right to emigrate, without a visa, to the United States .

The vast Kwajalein Missile Range was built Marshall Islands during the Cold War.

Gallery

See also
List of islands of the Marshall Islands
US Naval Advance Bases
World War II United States Merchant Navy

External links
youtube.com  Majuro Atoll Marshall Island
youtube.com  Task Force At  Majuro Atoll Marshall Island

References

Naval Stations of the United States Navy
Closed installations of the United States Navy
1944 establishments in Oceania
Military installations established in 1944
Kwajalein Atoll
Naval Base Marshall Islands